The Las Tiendas Building is a two-story reinforced Spanish Eclectic style commercial building in downtown Carmel-by-the-Sea, California. The building is the best and only example of Spanish Eclectic commercial design by the architectural firm of Swartz & Ryland in Carmel. It has been designated as an important commercial building in the city's downtown historic district property survey; and was registered with the California Register of Historical Resources on February 15, 2003. The building has been occupied by the Club since 2006.

History

In 1930, Ray C. De Yoe, of the Carmel Realty Company hired the Fresno, California architectural firm of Swartz & Ryland to design the Las Tiendas Building. It was built by Michael J. Murphy in 1930. Las Tiendas means "The Stores" in Spanish. It is located on Ocean Avenue and San Carlos Street. The two-story building has a main opening and passageway that leads to the Carmel Coffee House with outdoor seating in the courtyard. It has a low-pitched Mission tile roof, with three chimneys, a low base of colorful Spanish tiles, archways, and a wooden Monterey-style balcony. The concrete stairs have the original colorful hand-made imported Spanish tiles on the rise of the steps on the staircase. It has hand-made, hand-forged wrought iron balconies and window rails. There is the stenciling Las Tiendas on the front overhead entry. Two stores face Ocean Avenue. Four offices are in the rooms upstairs. The Spanish Eclectic design is like the El Paseo and  La Rambla buildings. It was the first commercial building in Carmel to have steam heat.

On November 17, 1933, the Carmel Pine Cone, included a notification for “Certificate of Doing Business,” for Byington Ford under the name of Carmel Realty Company, at office No. 2 in the Las Tiendas Building. The Carmel Realty Company is still a major real-estate company today.

The Sierra Club's offices opened in 1977 at the top upstairs office. Changes in the original building include interior remodel of the store (1952, 1995, 2001), installed gate in court (1970), reroof (1990), interior remodel of the Coffee Shop (1994), and created opening in interior wall (1997).

The building qualifies for inclusion in the downtown historic district property survey because of its the best example of Spanish Eclectic commercial design by Swartz & Ryland in Carmel, first building in Carmel to have steam heat, and was built for early Carmel realtor Ray DeYoe and former California State Assembly.

Swartz & Ryland
Fred L. Swartz (1885-1968) was a graduate of the University of Pennsylvania. Columbus J. Ryland (1892-1980) studied engineering at the California Normal School of Arts and Crafts and at the University of Toulouse, in France. Ryland joined Swartz in Fresno, California in 1919. Projects they did together included a Fresno home for C. H. Ingram (1923), Oakland Union Bus Depot (1926), Bank of Carmel (1929), Fresno State College Library in 1931, (now Fresno City College), and the Sunset Center (1931). Ryland and M.J. Murphy built the Sunset School's Gothic Revival-style auditorium annex used by the Carmel Music Society. They kept their partnership until Ryland went into private practice in the mid 1930s.

Ryland is best known for his design of the Monterey City Hall (1936) and the Santa Cruz City Hall (1937), and designing buildings for the Santa Clara County Fairgrounds in San Jose, California.

See also
 Spanish Colonial Revival architecture

References

External links

 Downtown Conservation District Historic Property Survey
 Carmel Realty Company

1930 establishments in California
Carmel-by-the-Sea, California
Buildings and structures in Monterey County, California
Spanish Colonial Revival architecture in California